Eshpala (also Romanized as Eshpalā; also known as Eshbālīq, Eshbelā, Eshīlā, and Ishpala) is a village in Chahar Farizeh Rural District, in the Central District of Bandar-e Anzali County, Gilan Province, Iran. At the 2006 census, its population was 200, in 62 families.

References 

Populated places in Bandar-e Anzali County